Craig Daryl Crawford (born 17 January 1970) is an Australian politician currently serving as the Queensland Minister for Seniors and Disability Services and Minister for Aboriginal and Torres Strait Islander Partnerships. He has been the Labor member for the Far North Queensland seat of Barron River in the Queensland Legislative Assembly since 2015.

Career
Crawford began his professional career working in hotel management. During his 20 years of voluntary service to the Victorian Country Fire Authority, he was promoted to the rank of captain and selected to be an ambulance paramedic. He went on to work for both Ambulance Victoria and the Queensland Ambulance Service respectively for over 15 years. He has a Diploma of Ambulance Paramedic Studies and a Certificate IV in Fire Technology.

Prior to his promotion to the Second Palaszczuk Ministry, Crawford served as a member of Queensland Parliament's Ethics Committee from February 2016 to November 2017, and also as a member of the Infrastructure, Planning and Natural Resources Committee from May 2016 to November 2017.

Personal life 
Crawford married his wife Rosalie at Queensland Parliament House in Brisbane in April 2016.

See also
Second Palaszczuk Ministry
Third Palaszczuk Ministry

References

1970 births
Living people
Members of the Queensland Legislative Assembly
Australian Labor Party members of the Parliament of Queensland
Labor Left politicians
Paramedics
21st-century Australian politicians